East High School, often locally referred to as East or East High, is a public secondary school located in Des Moines, Iowa, United States. East is the oldest high school in the Des Moines metro and is part of the Des Moines Public Schools. East is currently the seventh largest high school in the state by enrollment with 2,076 students.

History
East High was established in 1861 on the top floor of Bryant School, a primary school located at East 9th and Grand Ave. (sometimes listed as Pennsylvania Ave. and Grand Ave. - the other end of the same block) in Des Moines.

Graduation rates in the early years were extremely low - an Elizabeth Mathews was the sole member of the very first graduating class in 1871, and there were no further high school graduates until 1875. In 1877, the high school moved to the top floor of Webster School at the corner of E. 12th and Lyon Street, where it remained until 1891. Rising enrollment forced the freshman class back to Bryant School in 1888.

In 1891, a new and larger dedicated school building with an auditorium, cafeteria and laboratories was opened at E. 12th and Court, directly adjacent to the Iowa State Capitol grounds. At inception, in addition to the high school it housed all the primary students from Bryant and Webster, as well as the offices of the Board of Education and Superintendent. It is written that the students from Bryan and Webster marched to the new facility in a snowstorm. The primary students remained until 1903, when Cary School was built to house them. Originally there were about 200 students, subsequently growing to around 700. One of the few available photos of this building is on the cover of the 1910 Quill yearbook.

In anticipation of yet a larger school, an entire square block of land just a few blocks away from the Capitol was purchased by the East Des Moines School District in 1901 from the State of Iowa for $8,000. The current main building of East High School at E. 13th and Walker St. was constructed in 1910-1911 at a cost of $400,000 to a design by architects Bird and Rawson. A bond issue and ultimately an Iowa Supreme Court ruling were required to allow construction to go forward. Groundbreaking was done by Principal May Goodrell on September 6, 1910, who also placed the cornerstone on January 18, 1911. However, construction costs had consumed the entire budget, leaving little money for furnishings. This delayed occupancy of the building until May 17, 1912, when once again a procession of students marched from the 1891 building to the new school, bringing furnishings with them.

From 1911 onward, the East High campus has never moved again, and it has remained continuously in use as a three- or four-year high school. The main building has received a number of additions, such that it is now surrounded on three sides by newer construction, leaving only the original West-facing neo-classical facade fully exposed (see infobox photo).

On March 7, 2022, it was reported that a school shooting had occurred on the property, killing  15 year old Jose David Lopez and hospitalizing two female students. Police said that the shots most likely came from a moving vehicle. Police said that Jose David Lopez was not a student of the school but he was the intended target of the shooting. Police had several suspects in custody just hours after the event occurred.

Campus
East High is located on East 14th Street (also known as U.S. Route 69) in Des Moines, close to Interstate 235. There is ample grass-covered recreation space, as well as parking, to the west and north of the main building. There is one annex, situated a block away from the main campus.

Main Building Complex
While the main East High is one large building, it consists of several distinct areas built at different times. Some facilities, including the cafeteria, offices, band room, and student center have been relocated more than once, and the East wing was substantially altered in the large 2006 renovation.

Main Building (built 1910, dedicated 1911, occupied 1912, renovated 2005 with completion on January 4, 2006). Four stories high, the first floor houses Special Education, Speech, Foreign Language, and Home Economics classes. The second floor is home to the auditorium, counselors' offices, and History and Drama classes. The third floor houses general English and Math classes. The fourth floor holds the art rooms and Special Education classes.
East Wing or Gym Wing (1955). Originally home to the main gymnasium, weight room, student center, and Technology Education classes.
South Wing or Media Center (1968). The first two floors are occupied by the East High Library, while English classrooms take up the third floor.
North Wing (1973). The first floor holds Mathematics classrooms and counseling offices, while the second floor hosts Economics and Computer Sciences.
Renovations, new connector building and performing arts wing (completed August 2006).Major $22.6M project with over 100,000 sq. ft. of construction that replaced the student center, cafeteria, offices, music rooms, gymnasium and locker rooms.

Walker Annex
Beginning with the 2008-2009 school year, freshman classes were moved to the Walker Annex, located one block away from the main campus. Freshmen attended physical education, chorus, band, and orchestra classes on the main campus, but attended their basic science, math, English, and history courses in the Walker building. In 2012, freshman classes were switched back to the main building. The Walker Annex is now used for students with academic and attendance issues.

Students
As of the 2021-2022 school year, there were 2076 students enrolled at East High, making it the seventh largest public high school in Iowa.

Enrollment
Including some selected historic years for which data is available.

Curriculum
The school day is split into four periods of course instruction on an alternating A day/B day schedule. There are four lunches, over the period of two and one half hours. Students can earn an extra half of an hour of lunch for demonstrating proficiency on the Iowa Assessments. The school district requires that students take a number of core academic courses, if they wish to graduate and receive a diploma. This includes Social Studies, English, Mathematics, Science, Art, and Physical Education. The amount of academic credit needed to satisfy graduation requirements is determined by the school district.

All students are required by the district to enroll in four subject courses and a Physical Education course. However, the school compels Freshman and Sophomore students to schedule a full day of classes, to ensure satisfaction with district graduation requirements. Seniors have the option of having an "open period" during the first or last period of the school day. However, Juniors require parental permission to have an open period.

The district requires 2 semesters of Physical Education. Freshmen and Sophomores usually take their P.E. courses at the school. Juniors and Seniors have the option of taking alternative P.E. programs.

Achievements

Athletic Championships
2011 Girl's Class 4A State Softball Champions
2011 Girls' Class 4A State Basketball Champions
2006 Girls' Class 4A State Softball Champions
1981 Girls' Softball Champions
1980 Class 4A State Baseball Champions
1979 Girls' State Basketball Champions
Boys' Cross Country Team State Championships: 1937 A, 1941 A, 1942 A, 1943 A, 1949 AA.
Boys' Golf State Champions 1928. 
Boys' Track and Field Team State Champions: 1909, 1926, 1928, 1936, 1938, 1939, 1940, 1943, 1944, 1950 A, 1951 A.

Academics
1998 Iowa Teacher of the Year, Ruth Ann Gaines

Notable alumni

Gregory Alan Williams, actor in films, including Remember the Titans, Major League, Above the Law, In the Line of Fire and Old School. Appearances on TV shows including Baywatch, The West Wing, The Sopranos and Boston Public.
Lorri Bauman, Class of 1980, first Women's NCAA Basketball player to score 3,000 points. One of five NCAA women basketball players to reach that milestone. Inducted into the Iowa Girls High School Athletic Union Basketball Hall of Fame.
Pauline Brown Humphrey- Iowa cosmetologist and business woman
Stephen Kline, artist, photographer, and designer of the $10,000,000 Florida State of the Arts License Plate. Recent works include his new Lines of Language technique, creating drawings from words. Early works include the 1961 Quill cover.

See also
Des Moines Independent Community School District for other schools in the same district.
List of high schools in Iowa

References

External links
Des Moines Public Schools Homepage
East High School Homepage
Des Moines Public Schools District History
East High School Alumni Association and Foundation
Photograph of the Bryant School building, first home of East High
Photograph of the Webster School building, second home of East High

Schools in Des Moines, Iowa
Educational institutions established in 1861
Public high schools in Iowa
Iowa High School Athletic Association
1861 establishments in Iowa